

The Mirach 150 is a reconnaissance unmanned aerial vehicle (UAV) developed in Italy in the 1990s. A turbojet-powered machine, it is apparently a derivative of the Mirach 100 series of targets, being of the same general size and also powered by a Microturbo TRS-18-1 turbojet.

Meteor is now promoting a new derivative of the Meteor 150, named the Nibbio, for tactical reconnaissance and other missions. It can be ground or air-launched, and is recovered by parachute.

Specifications (Mirach 150)

References
This article contains material that originally came from the web article Unmanned Aerial Vehicles by Greg Goebel, which exists in the Public Domain.
 Jane's Unmanned Aerial Vehicles and Targets
 Mirach 100/5 on Leonardocompany.com

1990s Italian military reconnaissance aircraft
Unmanned aerial vehicles of Italy
Mirach 150
V-tail aircraft